Russian censorship can refer to:

 Censorship in the Russian Empire
 Censorship in the Soviet Union
 Censorship in the Russian Federation
 Russian government censorship of Chechnya coverage
 Internet censorship in Russia